Frazier Glacier is a glacier between the Clare Range and Detour Nunatak, flowing northeast to join Mackay Glacier east of Pegtop Nunatak, in Victoria Land, Antarctica. It was named by the Advisory Committee on Antarctic Names in 1964 for Lieutenant W.F. Frazier, officer in charge at Byrd Station, 1963.

References

Glaciers of Victoria Land
Scott Coast